The Uddevalla Bridge is a cable-stayed bridge crossing Sunninge sound near Uddevalla in the province of Bohuslän on the west coast of Sweden.

Dimensions 
The cables are organised in a semi-fan arrangement.

The bridge was constructed in 1996–2000 and was opened for traffic on 20May 2000.

Construction notes 
Structural engineering for the bridge was carried out by Johs Holt AS, and Skanska Teknik AB. Skanska also served as general contractor, with subcontractors Alpin Technik und Ingenieurservice GmbH (general), VSL International (cables), Mageba (bearings), and PERI GmbH (formwork and scaffolding).

The cables are steel and the deck is composite steel-reinforced concrete, while the pylons are reinforced concrete. The bridge and the connecting Sunningeleden cost of SEK 900 M (US$111 M) in 2000 currency values.

There is a problem with ice sticking to the cables in the winter, which can fall onto cars. The bridge has to be closed a few times per year for this reason. The alternative road is  longer.
Civil engineers have tested pulse electro-thermal de-icing - a way to use a burst of electricity to remove ice caked on walls or windows. For surfaces coated with a special film, the jolt gets rid of ice in less than a second, far less time than it takes to hack at it with an ice scraper.

References

External links 

, PETD article on CNet

Cable-stayed bridges in Sweden
Bridges completed in 2000
Buildings and structures in Uddevalla